The La Crosse Blackhawks was the final moniker of the a minor league baseball teams based in La Crosse, Wisconsin that played under various names between 1905 and 1942. La Crosse teams played as members of the Wisconsin State League (1940–1942), Wisconsin-Illinois League (1926), Central Association (1917), Northern League (1913), Minnesota-Wisconsin League (1909–1912), Wisconsin-Illinois League (1908) and Wisconsin State League (1905–1907).

The La Crosse Blackhawks were an affiliate of the St. Louis Cardinals in 1942.

Major League Baseball players Jeff Pfeffer, Bill Schardt, Doc Watson and Jack Zalusky played for La Crosse teams.

References

External links
Baseball Reference

Defunct minor league baseball teams
Baseball teams established in 1905
Baseball teams disestablished in 1942
St. Louis Cardinals minor league affiliates
Wisconsin State League teams
Central Association teams
Wisconsin-Illinois League teams
Northern League (1902-71) baseball teams
Professional baseball teams in Wisconsin
1942 disestablishments in Wisconsin
Sports in La Crosse, Wisconsin
1905 establishments in Wisconsin
Defunct baseball teams in Wisconsin